New Woman is an Indian lifestyle magazine. It is published by Pioneer Book Company Private Limited. New Woman is based in Mumbai, India. Hema Malini is its editor.

History and profile
The first edition was published in December 1996.

The magazine covers beauty, fashion, cosmetics, apparel, jewellery, the latest products, fitness, health, finance, career, self-help, relationships, sex, parenting, travel, art, music, books, cinema, social issues, legal matters, enterprise, and food. Its main focus is in-depth articles, stunning photo features, fashion and beauty spreads, fiction, and highly inspirational interviews. New Woman covers aspects of women's lives in language that is contemporary and young.

As of June 12, 2013, notable actress Hema Malini is the editor of the magazine.

References

External links
 

1996 establishments in Maharashtra
English-language magazines published in India
Monthly magazines published in India
Women's magazines published in India
Magazines established in 1996
Mass media in Mumbai
Women's fashion magazines